Adam Holzman (born 15 February 1958 in New York City) is an American jazz keyboardist. He is the son of Elektra Records' founder Jac Holzman.

Biography
In the early 1980s, Holzman founded the Fents with Ted Hall. In 1985, he was hired by Miles Davis to play keyboards on the trumpeter's Tutu album, and stayed with him for four years, eventually becoming his musical director. He can be seen performing in the Davis concert video That's What Happened: Live in Germany 1987. In the early 1990s, he founded the band Mona Lisa Overdrive, which changed its name to Brave New World due to copyright issues.

Holzman has performed as a sideman with Bob Belden, Tom Browne, Wayne Escoffery, Charles Fambrough, Anton Fig, Robben Ford, Jane Getter, Randy Hall, Ray Manzarek, Jason Miles, Marcus Miller, Michel Petrucciani, Wallace Roney, Steps Ahead, Grover Washington Jr., Lenny White, Ray Wilson, and Steven Wilson.  Many of these performers he has also produced, arranged, and composed for.

Discography

As leader/co-leader
 1992 In a Loud Way (Manhattan)
 1994 Overdrive (Lipstick)
 1995 Manifesto (Lipstick)
 1997 The Big Picture - credited as Adam Holzman & Brave New World (Escapade)
 2001 Rebellion - credited as Adam Holzman & Brave New World (Big Fun Productions)
 2003 Live 1994 (AA)
 2004 Neon Beef Thermometer: Live in New York - credited as Adam Holzman & Brave New World (Big Fun Productions)
 2005 Jazz Rocket Science - credited as Adam Holzman & Brave New World (Nagel-Heyer)
 2010 Spork - credited as Adam Holzman & Brave New World (Big Fun Productions)
 2012 H3 (Composers Concordance Records)
 2013 Parallel Universe: Solo Electronic Explorations (Composers Concordance Records)
 2015 The Deform Variations 
 2018 Truth Decay (Big Fun Productions)
2021 The Last Gig

As sideman
With Bob Belden
 1991 Straight to My Heart: The Music of Sting
 1994 When the Doves Cry: The Music of Prince
 1996 Shades of Blue

With Miles Davis
 1986 Tutu
 1987 Music from Siesta, Miles Davis/Marcus Miller
 1996 Live Around the World 
 1998 Live in France
 2002 The Complete Miles Davis at Montreux
 2005 Munich Concert
 2005 The Cellar Door Sessions 1970
 2006 The Prince of Darkness: Live in Europe
 2009 That's What Happened: Live in Germany, 1987
 2016 Live in San Juan '89

With Jane Getter
 1998 Jane
 2005 See Jane Run
 2012 Three Jane

With Michel Petrucciani
 1989 Music
 1991 Live
 1991  Playground

With Wallace Roney
No Room for Argument (Stretch, 2000)
Prototype (HighNote, 2004)
Mystikal (HighNote, 2005)

With Grover Washington
 1996 Soulful Strut
 1997 Breath of Heaven: A Holiday Collection
 2004 Trios
 2010 Grover Live

With Steven Wilson
 2012 Catalogue / Preserve / Amass
 2012  Get All You Deserve 
 2013 Drive Home
 2013  The Raven that Refused to Sing (And Other Stories) 
 2015  Hand. Cannot. Erase.
 2015 Transience
 2016 4½
 2017 To the Bone
 2018 Home Invasion: In Concert at the Royal Albert Hall
 2021 The Future Bites

With others
 1983 Carmina Burana, Ray Manzarek
 1988 Love You Like a Stranger, Randy Hall
 1994 Vibe, Steps Ahead
 1995 Keeper of the Spirit, Charles Fambrough
 1995 Present Tense, Lenny White
 1998 Endless Miles, Various
 1998 Getting Even, Dennis Chambers
 1999 R 'N' Browne,  Tom Browne 
 2002 Figments, Anton Fig
 2003 Change, Ray Wilson
 2005 Miles to Miles: In the Spirit of Miles Davis, Jason Miles
 2012 The Only Son of One, Wayne Escoffery
 2016 2112 40th Anniversary, Rush

References

External links
 

Living people
1958 births
21st-century American keyboardists
Nagel-Heyer Records artists
Manhattan Records artists
Naxos Records artists